Leucopogon breviflorus is a species of flowering plant in the heath family Ericaceae and is endemic to the south-west of Western Australia. The flowers are borne singly or in pairs in leaf axils on a short peduncle with small bracts and bracteoles about half as long as the sepals.

It was first formally described in 1864 by Ferdinand von Mueller in Fragmenta Phytographiae Australiae from specimens collected by George Maxwell near Israelite Bay. The specific epithet (breviflorus) means "short-flowered". 

This leucopogon occurs in the Esperance Plains and Mallee bioregions of south-western Western Australia and is listed (as Styphelia breviflora) as "not threatened" by the Western Australian Government Department of Biodiversity, Conservation and Attractions.

References

breviflorus
Ericales of Australia
Flora of Western Australia
Plants described in 1864
Taxa named by Ferdinand von Mueller